Inverloch  is a seaside town located in Victoria, Australia and the most populous city of the Bass Coast Shire. Known originally for the calm waters of Anderson Inlet, it is now also known for the discovery of Australia's first dinosaur bone.

The town had a population of 5,437 as of the 2016 census.

Inverloch is a popular tourist destination, particularly for swimming, kitesurfing and windsurfing at the calm waters of Anderson Inlet. Fishing and surfing are also popular.

The town is named after Loch Inver (Lake Entrance) in Scotland.

History

The Bunurong aboriginal people were custodians of this stretch of coast for thousands of years prior to white settlement.

The first European to settle in the Inverloch area was Samuel Anderson who, together with his brothers and Robert Massie, owned cattle and grew wheat in the area. The Post Office opened on 1 September 1883 as Anderson's Inlet and was renamed Inverloch in 1889. The inlet on which the town is situated on is named Anderson Inlet after Samuel Anderson.

As the area developed, Inverloch became a port for the shipment of black coal from Wonthaggi to Melbourne.

Australia’s first discovered dinosaur bone, known as the Cape Paterson Claw, was discovered here in 1903 by William Ferguson in Cape Paterson, in what is now Eagles Nest in the Bunurong Marine National Park.

Population
At the 2016 Census, there were 5,437 people in Inverloch. 79.6% of people were born in Australia, with the next most common country of birth was England at 4.6%. 89.1% of people spoke only English at home. The most common responses for religion were No Religion at 39.5%, Catholic at 20.0% and Anglican at 14.9%.

Today

Anderson Inlet
Anderson Inlet is a shallow and dynamic estuary where the Tarwin River enters Bass Strait.  It forms a 2,400 hectare almost-enclosed bay next to Inverloch, for which it provides a popular and protected beach. At low tide its intertidal mudflats provide important feeding habitat for migratory waders. It is named after the Anderson brothers, the first Europeans to settle in the area. Anderson Inlet is classified by BirdLife International as an Important Bird Area.  It supports internationally significant numbers (over 6,000) of red-necked stint.  It has also been known to support the critically endangered orange-bellied parrot, with six birds seen there in 1998 and two in 1999.
Seashell collecting is permitted from The Caves (beach) to the north-east, past the main shopping precinct. Seashell collecting is prohibited in the Bunurong Marine National Park, namely The Oaks, Twin Reefs, Shack Bay and Eagles Nest (beaches), heading south-west after Flat Rocks and The Caves.

Farmers Market
The town showcases local produce from the farms and towns of South Gippsland, local artists, entertainers, community groups and service clubs at a monthly market held by the Lions Club on the last Sunday of every month.

Shell Museum
Inverloch has a Shell Museum which also has a dinosaur exhibition. It is located opposite the Rainbow Park. Australia’s first dinosaur bone, and many other dinosaur bones, were discovered in Inverloch.

Coast
Inverloch's beaches include Twin Reefs, Shack Bay, Eagles Nest, The Caves, Flat Rocks, Main Surf Beach, two more surf beaches, Anderson Inlet-Western Beach, Anderson Inlet-Browns Beach, Anderson Inlet-Venus Street and Anderson Inlet-The Glades. Twin Reefs, Shack Bay and Eagles Nest make up most of the Bunurong Marine National Park (excluding The Oaks in Cape Paterson). The Caves and Flat Rocks are a part of the Bunurong Marine Park, which starts at Coal Point in Harmers Haven.

Bunurong Marine Parks

Bunurong Marine Park is a 17 km marine and coastal park along the coast of Harmers Haven, Cape Paterson and Inverloch, namely Coal Point to Wreck Creek.

Bunurong Marine National Park is an outstretching middle section of Bunurong Marine Park. The National Park part is about 21 km2 or about 5 km in length along the coast and stretching from 2.5 km east of Cape Paterson eastwards to a point 6 km south-west of Inverloch, extending seawards for 3 nm to the limit of Victorian waters. The restricted zone/state park (Bunurong Marine National Park inside Bunurong Marine Park), on foot begins after Undertow Bay heading towards Inverloch from Cape Paterson. It is an area past Safety Beach and rockpool and past Undertow Bay beach namely The Oaks, Twin Reefs, Shack Bay and Eagles Nest. It ends at Wreck Creek in Inverloch. It is prohibited to kill or take any matter (i.e., fishing, collecting seashells or kill or take any sea or land animal, living or dead) from the smaller of the two parks; Bunurong Marine National Park.

Both parks are named after the Bunurong Aboriginal people.

Bunurong Marine Park is considered special due to the unusual set of environmental conditions. It supports many marine animals including seastars, featherstars, crabs, snails, 87 species of fish, Whales and Seals. It has the highest recorded diversity of intertidal and subtidal invertebrates in eastern Victoria. The range of seaweed species is large.

Flat Rocks is a beach which has large rockpools for rockpooling/rambling and direct access from Cape Paterson-Inverloch Road. Bunurong Marine Park is seen and accessed at many different points along this coast, a popular one being near Cape Paterson caravan park on Surf Beach Road as it has a modified rockpool for swimming. The National Park is around to the left. Direct and more difficult access to the National Park is via car parks off Cape Paterson-Inverloch Road. Exploring, snorkelling and scuba diving are popular. There are boat launching facilities at Inverloch on Anderson Inlet.

Eagles Nest
Eagles Nest is a large rock structure adjacent to the coastline that resembles the top half of a map of Australia.

The Caves
The Caves is a beach with a set of pirate caves just past Eagles Nest.

Fishing
Inverloch is very popular for surf and bay fishing. Anderson Inlet and Inverloch Surf Beach are popular for fishing and a good catch is usually found. Surf fishing usually produces fish such as Silver Trevally, King George Whiting, Flathead, Mullet and Juvenile Snapper (pinky). There are two boat launches on in Inverloch on Anderson Inlet.

Festivals
The town hosts a jazz festival each Labour Day long weekend in March, featuring high-profile local and interstate musicians. The Food And Wine Festival is also in March.

Climate
Inverloch's location on the north shore of Bass Strait gives it an oceanic climate, with the moderating effect of the ocean allowing a narrower temperature range throughout the year compared to other regions in Victoria. Average daily maximum temperatures range from 23.5 °C in summer to 13.5 in winter. Frost is rare, occurring on average 6 mornings a year. On 10 August 2005 Inverloch received its first snowfall since July 1951, with snow even settling briefly on the beach.

Education
Inverloch has one primary school. The nearest secondary school is in nearby Wonthaggi.

Facilities

 Farmers' market - 3rd Sunday every month, The Glade, Esplanade
 Anderson Inlet
 Surf Lifesaving Club, Geroke Street
 Shell Museum and Dinosaur Exhibition, Ramsey Boulevard
 Seashell Collecting is permitted on Inverloch coast from The Caves to Anderson Inlet - Small sizes and small quantities of empty seashells, driftwood, dead fallen twigs's, sea glass and interesting rubbish
 Wyeth-McNamara Park - playground, shaded picnic areas, tables, barbecues, Ramsey Boulevard
 Melaleuca Links Golf Course, Bass Highway - 9 hole, par 3
 Inverloch Tennis Club, Pier Road
 Bunurong Marine Park - explore/snorkel, directly off Cape Paterson-Inverloch Road
 Bunurong Marine National Park - protected state park, explore/snorkel, Steps off Cape Paterson-Inverloch Road
 Screw Creek Walk (and Mangroves), eastern end of the Esplanade: 
 Inverloch has large chain stores; RACV Inverloch Resort (accommodation choices & restaurant/Sunday buffet), Foodworks supermarket. Four real estate agencies; Stockdale & Leggo, LJ Hooker, Alex Scott and First National. Mitre 10 (hardware), farmers market 3rd Sunday every month, cafes, restaurants, pubs, motels, bed and breakfasts, three caravan parks and a foreshore camping reserve.
 Wonthaggi Museum - open Saturday mornings, Murray Street, Wonthaggi
 State Coal Mine - museum and tours, Garden Street, Wonthaggi
 Wonthaggi Hospital - Graham Street, Wonthaggi
 Rotary Centenary Park - Start location of parkrun, held weekly on Saturday mornings at 7.45am

Localities
Other localities in this postcode:
 Pound Creek

Other localities nearby:
 Wonthaggi
 Leongatha
 Kongwak
 Venus Bay

References

External links
Dinosaur Dreaming Web Site
Dinosaur Dreaming At Inverloch
Inverloch Holiday Online Directory
Inverloch Surf Lifesaving Club Website
Inverloch Windsurfing Club Website
Inverloch Historical Society

Coastal towns in Victoria (Australia)
Mining towns in Victoria (Australia)
Towns in Victoria (Australia)
Bass Coast Shire